The Green Bay Marathon is an annual race event that takes place on the 3rd week of May in Green Bay, Wisconsin.

History 
The Green Bay Marathon began in June 2000 by Gloria West.  The current Race Director is Toni Jaeckels.  The races included are a full marathon, a 1/2 marathon, a 5k race, and a children's race.  Its official name is the "Cellcom Green Bay Marathon", as its major sponsor is Cellcom.

The current full marathon course record is 2:15:15 set by James Boit in 2010.
The current half marathon course record is 1:04:38 set by Shadrack Muteri in 2008. The men's marathon in 2008 was won by Ukraine's Andriy Toptun in a time of 2:22:51.

The race that was held on Sunday, May 20, 2012, was called, due to excessive heat.  This was the first year in the history of the race that this was done.  Due to unexpected and quickly escalating heat and humidity, the decision was made to call the race at approximately 9:35 a.m. after the 7:00 a.m. start.  In the marathon, only ten runners were scored.

The 2020 race weekend was canceled due to the COVID-19 pandemic. The race organizers gave an option to those who had already registered: run a virtual race or defer their entry to the 2021 race weekend. But the 2021 event was also canceled.

Course 
The course is relatively flat and fast.  One of the biggest features is the opportunity for runners and walkers to race the last tenth of a mile through historic Lambeau Field, home of the Green Bay Packers.

All of the weekend road race events start next to Lambeau Field on Lombardi Avenue.  The Cellcom 5K, held on Saturday, travels north through the tree-lined streets of west Green Bay.  On Sunday, the Cellcom Green Bay Half Marathon course follows nearly the same course as the 5K event, yet expands the distance to 13.1 miles and includes streets in Ashwaubenon. Also on Sunday and considered the main event, the Cellcom Green Bay Marathon course has its own unique route which travels from the stadium district, through Ashwaubenon and into De Pere.  From De Pere, the participants run along 6 miles of the Fox River Trail, through Allouez, and into downtown Green Bay.  At this time, the runners get a rare opportunity to run through City Stadium, which is the original game location of the historic Green Bay Packers NFL franchise. All three road courses, as well as the Wisconsin Public Service Kids' Power Run, make a victory lap inside Lambeau Field just before the finish line.

References

External links 
 Official Site 
 

2000 establishments in Wisconsin
Half marathons in the United States
Marathons in the United States
Recurring sporting events established in 2000
Sports in Green Bay, Wisconsin
Annual sporting events in the United States